Raymond Wong may refer to:

Raymond Wong (civil servant) (born 1958), current Permanent Secretary for Education and Manpower of Hong Kong
Raymond Wong Ho-yin (born 1975), Hong Kong actor
Raymond Wong Pak-ming (born 1946), Hong Kong film director, producer, scriptwriter and actor
Raymond Wong (composer), Hong Kong film score composer
Raymond K. Wong, Chinese-American writer, author of The Pacific Between
Raymond Wong Yuk-man (born 1951), radio host, political commentator, and member of the Legislative Council of Hong Kong
Ray Wong (born 1993), Hong Kong activist